Leon Carr (June 10, 1910 – March 27, 1976) was an American songwriter, composer, arranger, pianist and conductor. He developed some famed marketing jingles used in advertisements, including for Mounds candy ("Sometimes You Feel Like a Nut..."), Chevrolet ("See the U.S.A. In Your Chevrolet"), and the "Bert the Turtle" theme song for the nuclear public education awareness film Duck and Cover.

Biography
Carr was born in Allentown, Pennsylvania on June 10, 1910. He moved to New York City in 1935.

Education
Carr was educated at Pennsylvania State University. He also studied the Schillinger System at New York University in New York City.

Career
Carr's marketing jingles are among the best known in the history of commercials.  His biggest non-jingle hit was "There's No Tomorrow", a parody of "O Sole Mio", which was popularized by Tony Martin in the film Two Tickets to Broadway and spent 27 weeks on the Billboard charts in 1949, peaking at #2.

Carr's other popular song compositions include "Bell Bottom Blues", "Hotel Happiness", "Herthquake", "Hey There Lonely Girl", "Your Socks Don't Match", "A Man Could Be a Wonderful Thing", "Goblins in the Steeple", "Big Name Button", "If You Smile at the Sun", "I'd Do It All Again", "Skiddle-Diddle-Dee", "Should I Wait?", "Our Everlasting Love", "Another Cup of Coffee", "Most People Get Married", "Clinging Vine", "Marriage Is for Old Folks", "The Secret Life", and "Confidence".

Artists who have recorded Carr's popular music include Brook Benton, Teresa Brewer, Vikki Carr, Vic Damone, Roy Hamilton, Tom Jones, Dean Martin, Tony Martin, Johnny Mathis, Guy Mitchell, Patti Page, Gene Pitney, Louis Prima, Buddy Rich, Nina Simone, Mel Tormé, Bobby Vinton, and Anita Baker. In 1938, Jimmie Lunceford's orchestra recorded Carr's instrumental composition "Frisco Fog", which prefigured Duke Ellington's celebrated 1940 "Ko-Ko".

Carr also composed the off-Broadway musical The Secret Life of Walter Mitty based on the short story of the same name by James Thurber, which opened at The Players Theatre in Greenwich Village on October 26, 1964 and ran for 96 performances.

References

1910 births
1976 deaths
20th-century American composers
20th-century American male musicians
American musical theatre composers
Musicians from Allentown, Pennsylvania
Musicians from New York City
New York University alumni
Pennsylvania State University alumni
Songwriters from New York (state)
Songwriters from Pennsylvania